The Boston Aeronautical Society was founded by James Means, Albert A. Merrill, and William H. Pickering on March 19, 1895. In 1896, the Boston Aeronautical Society developed an "experiment fund" and accepted donations in order to promote future innovations. The Blue Hill Meteorological Observatory was utilized for experiments conducted by members.

References

Aeronautics organizations
Aviation in Massachusetts
Organizations based in Boston